The princely state of Kalat in Balochistan acceded to the Dominion of Pakistan on 27 March 1948, after having declared independence earlier on 15 August 1947. It was accepted by the Governor General Muhammad Ali Jinnah on 31 March, making Kalat an integral part of Pakistan. The accession was a stormy affair. Whether it had the consensus of its subjects remains disputed and Insurgencies against the state of Pakistan continue till the present day.

See also

 Balochistan
 Instrument of Accession
 Princely State

References

Bibliography
 

Legal documents
History of the Republic of India
Indian documents
1947 in India
1947 in Pakistan
Treaties concluded in 1947
Treaties entered into force in 1947
1947 documents